The 1950 Penya Rhin Grand Prix was a non-championship Formula One motor race held at Pedralbes Circuit on 29 October 1950.

Classification

Race

References

Penya Rhin
Penya Rhin Grand Prix
1950 in Spanish motorsport